Georgia-Pacific Center is a , 1,567,011 sq.ft skyscraper in downtown Atlanta, Georgia, United States. It contains 52 stories of office space and was finished in 1982. Before the six-year era of tall skyscrapers to be built in Atlanta, it was Atlanta's second-tallest building (only surpassed by the Westin Peachtree Plaza Hotel) from 1982 to 1987. It has a stair-like design that staggers down to the ground, and is clad in pink granite quarried from Marble Falls, Texas.

The tower is on the former site of the Loew's Grand Theatre, where the premiere for the 1939 film Gone with the Wind was held (133 Peachtree St. NE, near the intersection of Peachtree and Forsyth streets). The theatre could not be demolished because of its landmark status; it burned down in 1978, clearing the way for the tower.

The architectural firm that designed it was Skidmore, Owings & Merrill. The general contractor who constructed the project was a joint venture of J.A. Jones Construction Company's Atlanta office and the H.J. Russell Company, also of Atlanta. The tower is the world headquarters of Georgia-Pacific. Other tenants include consulting firm McKinsey & Company and the downtown branch of the High Museum of Art, which opened in 1986.

On March 14, 2008, the tower sustained minor damage when a tornado tore through downtown Atlanta. A number of windows were blown out. It was the first tornado to hit the downtown area since weather record keeping began in the 1880s.

The Consulate-General of the United Kingdom is located in the building. The building served as a filming location for the 1985 action film Invasion U.S.A. starring Chuck Norris and Richard Lynch, in which it served as the setting for the final battle between the U.S. Army and the army of international terrorists.

See also
 List of tallest buildings in Atlanta

References

External links

Headquarters in the United States
Skyscraper office buildings in Atlanta
Office buildings completed in 1982
Skidmore, Owings & Merrill buildings
Georgia-Pacific
1982 establishments in Georgia (U.S. state)